Imre Alker (born 1 December 1941) is a Hungarian wrestler. He competed at the 1964 Summer Olympics and the 1968 Summer Olympics.

References

External links
 
 
 
 

1941 births
Living people
Hungarian male sport wrestlers
Olympic wrestlers of Hungary
Wrestlers at the 1964 Summer Olympics
Wrestlers at the 1968 Summer Olympics
People from Püspökladány
Sportspeople from Hajdú-Bihar County